Annedroids is a Canadian CGI/live action children's television series created by J. J. Johnson. In association with broadcasters TVOntario, SRC and KiKa, Sinking Ship Entertainment produces the series. It was released on Amazon Video on July 25, 2014 in the UK and U.S., and premiered on August 25, 2014 on TVOKids in Ontario, Canada. The show's aim is to educate children about science, technology, engineering and math (STEM) from the perspectives of an 11-year-old girl, her friends, and her three android creations.

Series overview

Episode list

Season 1 (2014)

Season 2 (2015)

Season 3 (2016)

Season 4 (2017)

Notes

References 

Lists of Canadian children's animated television series episodes
Lists of Canadian comedy television series episodes